In Color  is the second studio album by Cheap Trick, released in 1977 and produced by Tom Werman.

This album is considered a classic of the power pop genre. The album was ranked No. 4 on Shake Some Action: The Ultimate Power Pop Guide. In 2003, the album was also ranked number 443 on Rolling Stone magazine's list of the 500 greatest albums of all time. The lead single, "I Want You to Want Me", while not initially successful, became a top 10 hit as a live version from the Cheap Trick at Budokan album and remains the band's signature song.

Overview
In Color, as opposed to the band's self-titled debut, features a more polished production in the hopes of making a commercial impact. 

The album made the band superstars in Japan, where "I Want You to Want Me" and "Clock Strikes Ten" were hit singles.

Five of the ten tracks on In Color were later released in live form on Cheap Trick's live album Cheap Trick at Budokan ("Hello There", "Big Eyes", "I Want You to Want Me", "Clock Strikes Ten" and "Come On, Come On").

In Color'''s front cover has a color photo of Robin Zander and Tom Petersson sitting on motorcycles with the words "Cheap Trick, In Color." across the top. Its back cover has an upside-down black-and-white photo of Carlos and Nielsen sitting on bicycles with the words "And In Black and White." across the top.

The In Colour radio show which airs on Ireland's national broadcaster Raidió Teilifís Éireann RTÉ 2XM is named after the album.

Re-recorded versionIn Color was re-recorded by the band in 1997 with producer Steve Albini. The band's intention was to record the album on their own terms and for the songs to sound the way that they had originally intended. It was never officially completed or released, but a rough mix of the album was leaked onto the internet along with a handful of other tracks recorded during the same sessions.

In September 2008, the re-recorded version of "Hello There" was featured as a playable song in the video game Rock Band 2, raising suspicions that the album may have been finished.

"Oh Boy," the B-side of the single "I Want You to Want Me" was re-recorded with vocals in 1980. It was released in 2003 on the "Oh Boy (Demo)/If You Want My Love (Demo)" promotional seven-inch vinyl record.

In April 2010, Rick Nielsen confirmed to the online music site Spinner that the band had in fact finished re-recording the album and planned to release the new version in "the not so distant future".

Later in an interview with Eddie Trunk in 2021, Tom Petersson claimed that the recordings were never finished.

Track listing

The 1998 reissue of In Color'' featured five bonus tracks, including the B-side to "I Want You to Want Me," entitled "Oh Boy," and "Goodnight," a live, show-closing variation of "Hello There."

Unreleased outtake

"Please Mrs. Henry" (instrumental Bob Dylan cover)

Personnel
Cheap Trick
 Robin Zander – lead vocals, rhythm guitar
 Rick Nielsen – lead guitars, vocals
 Tom Petersson – bass, vocals
 Bun E. Carlos – drums
Additional musicians
 Jai Winding – keyboards
 Jay Graydon - guitar on "I Want You to Want Me"
Technical
 Tom Werman – producer
 Antonino Reale – engineer
 George Marino – mastering
 Jim Charne, Paula Scher – design
 Benno Friedman – photography

Charts

2017 reissue

Certifications

References 

Cheap Trick albums
1977 albums
Epic Records albums
Albums produced by Tom Werman